Hyde Park Corner is between Knightsbridge, Belgravia and Mayfair in London, England. It primarily refers to its major road junction at the southeastern corner of Hyde Park, that was designed by Decimus Burton. Six streets converge at the junction: Park Lane (from the north), Piccadilly (northeast), Constitution Hill (southeast), Grosvenor Place (south), Grosvenor Crescent (southwest) and Knightsbridge (west). Hyde Park Corner tube station served by the Piccadilly line has many accessways around the junction as do its notable monuments. Immediately to the north of the junction is Apsley House, the home of the first Duke of Wellington; several monuments to the Duke stand in the vicinity, some installed during his lifetime, and others subsequently.

Creation by Decimus Burton

Central London parks
During the second half of the 1820s, the Commissioners of Woods and Forests and the King resolved that Hyde Park, and the area around it, must be renovated to the extent of the splendour of rival European capital cities, and that the essence of the new arrangement would be a triumphal approach to Buckingham Palace, which had been recently completed. The committee of the project, led by the Prime Minister, Lord Liverpool, and advised by Charles Arbuthnot, President of the Board of Commissioners of Woods and Forests, selected Decimus Burton as the project's architect: in 1828, when giving evidence to a Parliamentary Select Committee on the Government's spending on public works, Arbuthnot explained that he had nominated Burton 'having seen in the Regent's Park, and elsewhere, works which pleased my eye, from their architectural beauty and correctness'. Burton intended to create an urban space dedicated to the celebration of the House of Hanover, national pride, and the nation's heroes.

The renovation of Hyde Park, Green Park, and St James's Park, began, in 1825, with the demarcation of new drives and pathways, subsequent to which Burton designed new lodges and gates, viz. Cumberland Gate, Stanhope Gate, Grosvenor Gate, the Hyde Park Gate/Screen at Hyde Park Corner, and, later, the Prince of Wales's Gate, Knightsbridge, in the classical style. There were no authoritative precedents for such buildings, which required windows and chimney stacks, in the classical style, and, in the words of Guy Williams, 'Burton's reticent treatment of the supernumerary features' and of the cast iron gates and railings, was 'greatly admired'.

At Hyde Park Corner, the King required that 'some great ceremonial outwork that would be worthy of the new palace that lay to its rear', and accepted Burton's consequent proposal for a sequence comprising a gateway and a classical screen, and a triumphal arch, which would enable those approaching Buckingham Palace from the north to ride or drive first through the screen and then through the arch, before turning left to descend Constitution Hill and enter the forecourt of Buckingham Palace through Nash's Marble Arch. The screen became the Roman revival Hyde Park Gate/Screen at Hyde Park Corner, which delighted the King and his Committee, and which architectural historian Guy Williams describes as 'one of the most pleasing architectural works that have survived from the neo-classical age'. The triumphal arch became the Wellington Arch here to Constitution Hill facing Green Park, London, which has been described as 'one of London's best loved landmarks'. Burton's original design for the triumphal arch, which was modelled on the Arch of Titus at Rome, on which the central and side blocks of the Screen had been modelled, was more technically perfect, and coherent with the Screen, than that of the arch that was built: this original design, however, was rejected by the Committee—who had envisaged a design based on the Arch of Constantine (on which Nash's Marble Arch had been modelled)—because it was not sufficiently ostentatious. Burton created a new design, 'to pander to the majestic ego', which was much larger and modelled on a fragment found in the Ancient Roman forum, which was accepted on 14 January 1826, and subsequently built as the present Wellington Arch.

Sculpture of the Triumphal Arch
The arch at Constitution Hill was left devoid of decorative sculpture as a result of the moratorium in 1828 on public building work, and, instead, despite the absolute objection of Burton, was mounted with an ungainly equestrian statue of the Duke of Wellington by Matthew Cotes Wyatt, the son of the then recently deceased James Wyatt, who had been selected by statue's commissioner, and one of its few subsequent advocates, Sir Frederick Trench. Matthew Cotes Wyatt was not competent: Guy Williams contends that he was 'not noticeably talented', and the Dictionary of National Biography that 'thanks to royal and other influential patronage, Wyatt enjoyed a reputation and practice to which his mediocre abilities hardly entitled him'. Trench, and his patrons the Duke and Duchess of Rutland, had told the public subscribers to the statue that the statue would be place on top of Burton's triumphal arch at Hyde Park Corner: Burton expressed his opposition to this proposal 'as plainly and as vehemently as his nature allowed' consistently over successive years, because the ungainly statue would 'disfigure' his arch, for which it was much too large, and the surrounding neighbourhood, because it would have to be placed, contrary to all classical precedent, across, instead of parallel with, the roadway under the arch. Burton had envisaged that his arch would be topped with only a small quadriga whose horses would have been parallel with the road under the arch. Burton's objections were extensively endorsed by most of the aristocratic residents of London. A writer in The Builder asked Lord Canning, the First Commissioner for Woods and Forests, to ban the project: "We have learnt, and can state positively, that Mr. Burton has the strongest objection possible against placing the group in question on the archway... and that he is taking no part whatever in the alteration proposed to be made in the upper part of the structure to prepare it to receive the pedestal... Mr. Burton, through the mildness which characterizes him, has not expressed this opinion so loudly and so publicly as he ought to have done.... an opinion prevails very generally, that he is a party to the proceedings, and this has induced many to be silent who would otherwise have spoken...". The Prime Minister, Sir Robert Peel, contended that another site would be preferable, and proposed, on behalf of the Crown, to offer any other site, but the statue's subscribers rejected all alternative proposals. Every single MP except Sir Frederick Trench wanted the statue to be placed elsewhere. Canning wrote that 'the remonstrances which reach Her Majesty's Government against the proposed appropriation of the arch are so many and so strong, the representations of its architect, Mr. Burton, in the same sense, are so earnest, and the opinion of every other eminent architect, artist, or other competent authority who has been consulted on the subject is so decided [against the placing of the Wellington statue on the arch]".

Decimus Burton himself wrote, "The arch would, I consider, suffer greatly in importance if the colossal statue in question be placed there, because it would become a mere pedestal. The want of proportion in the proposed surmount, compared with the columns and other details of the architecture, would show that they had been designed by different hands, and without reference for each other. ...I have desired to witness the completion of this building, as originally designed by me, and as approved by the Lords of the Treasury, yet I would prefer that the building should remain for the present in its forlorn and bare state, rather than a colossal equestrian statue should be placed upon it... I fear that if this appropriation of the building should be decided upon, a proposition would soon be made for removing altogether the facades of columns, the slender proportions of which would appear so incongruous and out of proportion compared with the prodigious dimensions of the statue". Burton had realized that the disciples of Pugin and advocates of Pugin's anti-classicism would remove all classical elements from his arch if permitted the opportunity to do so.

The Government placed the Wellington statue on the arch in autumn 1846: Williams contends that the product was 'ridiculous'. The Builder contended, down, unquestionably, it must come. As the network of timber is removed, spar by spar, from before it, so do the folly of the experiment, the absurdity of the conjunction, and the greatness of the sacrifice become apparent. Its effect is even worse than we anticipated - the destruction of the arch by the statue, and of the statue by its elevation on the arch, more complete. Every post brings us letters urging renewed efforts to remove te figure to another site. The contestation about the prospective removal of the statue became national. However, the Government failed to remove the statue, despite that they had professed, when it had been placed, that they would do so if it provoked the aversion which it had provoked. Foreign intellectuals who visited London identified the incongruous fusion of the statue and the arch as 'spectacular confirmation' of the 'artistic ignorance of the English'. Architectural historian Guy Williams writes that "[the] arch at Hyde Park Corner is a visible reminder of one of the fiercest attacks that have ever been launched in the worlds of art and architecture. The face of London might have been very different now - freer, perhaps, of the 'monstrous carbuncles' so disliked by the present Prince of Wales - if the attacked party [Decimus Burton] had been a little more pugnacious, and so better equipped to stand his ground".

During 1882, traffic congestion at Hyde Park Corner motivated advocacy for Burton's triumphal arch to be moved to the top of Constitution Hill to create space for traffic. In response to this advocacy, Burton's great-nephew Francis Fearon compiled and published a pamphlet that advocated the removal of the Wellington statue from the arch in the event of the removal of the arch to another location: Fearon contended that the arch should be 'relieved once and for all of its unsightly load'. The campaign led by Fearon was successful: Wyatt's incongruous statue was removed to Aldershot, and its place on Burton's arch, which was moved to Constitution Hill in 1883, was occupied by a Quadriga by Captain Adrian Jones. Jones' statue is not nearly as elegant as Burton's designed statue intended for the arch, but it is more coherent with the arch than Wyatt's statue, and its figures, unlike those of Wyatt's statue, are aligned with the roadway under the arch. The boundary of Buckingham Palace's garden was moved south, and a new road named Duke of Wellington Place was created; this separated the space containing the Arch from the rest of the Green Park.

Development subsequent to Decimus Burton
Following the passage of the Park Lane Improvement Act 1958, Park Lane was widened in the early 1960s. For most of its length this was achieved by converting the former East Carriage Drive of Hyde Park into the northbound lanes of a dual carriageway, but at Hyde Park Corner, all lanes of traffic came together on a line immediately to the east of Apsley House that required demolition of houses on Piccadilly. This left Apsley House on an island site. The InterContinental London hotel was subsequently built on the cleared site between the new route of Park Lane and Hamilton Place.

At part of the same scheme, a tunnel was constructed beneath the junction to allow traffic to flow freely between Knightsbridge and Piccadilly. As a result, the area around the Arch became a large traffic island, mostly laid to grass, and accessible only by pedestrian underpassess, and formally ceased to be part of the Green Park.

Subsequent changes to the road layout in the 1990s reinstated a route between Hyde Park and the Green Park for pedestrians, cyclists and horseriders using surface-level crossings.

The traffic island includes a smaller equestrian statue of Wellington by Edgar Boehm—unveiled in 1888—the Machine Gun Corps Memorial, the Royal Artillery Memorial, the Australian War Memorial and the New Zealand War Memorial.

Other monuments in the vicinity of Hyde Park Corner include Adrian Jones's Monument to the Cavalry of the Empire (off the west side of Park Lane), Alexander Munro's Boy and Dolphin statue (in a rose garden parallel to Rotten Row, going west from Hyde Park Corner), the Queen Elizabeth Gate (behind Apsley House), the Wellington Monument (off the west side of Park Lane), and a statue of Lord Byron (on a traffic island opposite the Wellington Monument).

The term is often erroneously used for Speakers' Corner, at the north-eastern corner of Hyde Park.

In popular culture
The 1935 film Hyde Park Corner takes its name from the area, where it is set.
"Hyde Park Corner" was used as a codeword to announce to the government the death of King George VI in 1952.
"Hyde Park Corner" was the second episode of the first season of the Netflix series The Crown''. It covered the death of George VI and the accession of Elizabeth II.

Gallery of memorials

See also
 St George's Hospital, originally sited at Hyde Park Corner
 The Lanesborough, a hotel on Hyde Park Corner occupying the former St George's hospital buildings
 Death and state funeral of George VI, the code phrase "Hyde Park Corner" was used to notify authorities of his death

References

A Sculpture Walk in Hyde Park

External links

Streets in the City of Westminster
Road junctions in London
Hyde Park, London
Piccadilly
Decimus Burton buildings
A4 road (England)